No Place to Go is a 1939 American drama film, directed by Terry O. Morse and written by Fred Niblo Jr., Lee Katz and Lawrence Kimble. It was adapted from the 1924 play, Minick, written by Edna Ferber and George S. Kaufman.  The film stars Dennis Morgan, Gloria Dickson, Fred Stone, Sonny Bupp, Aldrich Bowker and Charles Halton. The film was released by Warner Bros. on September 23, 1939.

Plot
Andrew Plummer is a former soldier and boxer happily living in a home for veterans. Joe, having recently gotten a promotion at work, feels guilty that his father is living there and invites him to come live with him and his wife, Trudie. He writes in his letter that he needs his father's help at his job, as he knows his father would consider his living there a bother if it was on a regular invitation. While he enjoys it there with his friends, Andrew leaves under the impression that his son needs him. And as there is a long waiting list at the veterans home, he would be unable to return for years.

Once at Joe and Trudie's house, his good-natured but intrusive personality starts to get on the housekeepers' nerves. Over time, his daughter-in-law is worn down by his erratic character. Andrew soon learns that Joe doesn't really need help, and now has a lot of time on his hands. While out on a walk he befriends Tommy, an orphan shoeshine boy who lives with his Uncle Frank. He also meets a group of elderly men in the park, who mention the Hays Home for Aged Gentlemen, where you pay $500 and they take care of you for life. Tommy casually mentions the stack of nearly one thousand dollars in Andrew's chest to his Uncle, who then plans to steal the money.

In the meantime, Andrew overhears Trudie talking to Joe about the embarrassment his father has been causing her in front of their friends. He then tells them about his decision to move into the Hays Home. When he goes to get his $500, however, it is missing. He confronts Tommy about it, and he says that he didn't do it. Andrew then gets his new friends from the Hays Home together to go to Uncle Frank and get the money back. In the end, Andrew and Tommy become members of the Hays Home.

Cast 
Dennis Morgan as Joe Plummer
Gloria Dickson as Gertrude "Trudie" Plummer
Fred Stone as Andrew Plummer
Sonny Bupp as Tommy
Aldrich Bowker as Heffernan
Charles Halton as Mr. Bradford
Georgia Caine as Mrs. Bradford
Frank Faylen as Pete Shafter
Dennie Moore as Mrs. Harriet Shafter
Al Bridge as Frank Crowley 
Joe Devlin as Spud
Bernice Pilot as Birdie
Greta Meyer as Hilda
Christian Rub as Otto Schlemmer
Wright Kramer as Banning
Jimmy Conlin as Rivers 
Thomas Pogue as Oscar Lockwood

References

External links 
 

1939 films
Warner Bros. films
American drama films
1939 drama films
Films directed by Terry O. Morse
American black-and-white films
1930s English-language films
1930s American films